American International School in Cyprus (AISC) is a private coeducational school in Nicosia, Cyprus. It offers an American and international university preparatory education, including the option of the International Baccalaureate program for the last two years of secondary school. AISC is owned by Esol Education.

History
The building that currently houses AISC was originally constructed in 1950 and housed the St. Barbara's Polyclinic. In 1964, the clinic was converted into the Hill Hotel, and three floors were constructed. After the Hill Hotel closed in 1983, the school was founded in 1987 as the International School in Cyprus (ISC) and was later purchased in 1993 by its current owner Esol Education and changed the name to American International School in Cyprus. In 1994, the IB Diploma Programme was added to the 11th and 12th grade curriculum.

In 2014 the Cyprus Minister of Education prohibited AISC from charging a €750 building development fee.

Languages
The languages taught at AISC are English, Greek, French and Spanish.

Accreditation
AISC is accredited by the Middle States Association of Colleges and Schools (MSA) and Council of International Schools (CIS)

Membership
 European Council of International School (ECIS)
 National Honor Society (NHS)
 Mediterranean Association of International Schools (MAIS)
 Near-east South Asia Association of International Schools (NESA)
 Central and Eastern European Schools Association (CEESA)

Facilities
 Tennis courts
 Swimming Pool
 Outdoor sitting areas
 Library
 Theater
 Covered play areas
 Playground

Partnership

In April 2016, AISC and its parent organization, Esol Education, entered into an MOU with Stanford Pre-collegiate International Institutes, to send students from Cyprus to Stanford, California. The program allows students to experience college life at Stanford University, ranked in 2016 as #4 in the world by US News "Best Global University Ranking." The two-week residential program includes courses such as sciences and engineering, writing and humanities, covering concepts such as creativity, leadership, design-thinking, problem-solving, and communication, as well as field trips and excursions to other colleges and landmarks nearby. Students from 14 to 17 years may apply for the program and will be selected based on academic merit. The application process include submitting a letter of interest, academic work samples, teacher recommendations, report cards and an interview with AISC.

References

External links

International schools in Cyprus
Education in Nicosia
Cyprus
American international schools in Asia
Educational institutions established in 1987
1987 establishments in Cyprus